is a 2011 Japanese romance and mystery film directed by Masaaki Taniguchi who directed Time Traveller: The Girl Who Leapt Through Time in 2010. His directed film Snowflake was also released on the same day. In both films, Mirei Kiritani plays the lead role.

Cast
 Mirei Kiritani as Shima
 Takahiro Miura as Kōdai
 Reiko Takashima
 Sarara Tsukifune

References

External links
  
 
 乱反射(2011) at allcinema 
 乱反射 at KINENOTE 

2011 films
2010s Japanese films
2010s Japanese-language films
Japanese mystery films
Japanese romance films
2010s romance films
2010s mystery films